Loanwords have entered written and spoken Chinese from many sources, including ancient peoples whose descendants now speak Chinese. In addition to phonetic differences, varieties of Chinese such as Cantonese and Shanghainese often have distinct words and phrases left from their original languages which they continue to use in daily life and sometimes even in Mandarin. As a result of long-term direct relationships with northern peoples, starting from the pre-Christ period, there are many exchanges of words. In addition, there were times when northern tribes dominated China. Similarly, northern dialects include relatively greater numbers of loanwords from nearby languages such as Turkic, Mongolian, and Manchu(Tungusic).

Throughout China, Buddhism has also introduced words from Sanskrit and Pali. More recently, foreign invasion and trade since the First and Second Opium Wars of the mid-nineteenth century has led to prolonged contact with English, French, and Japanese. Although politically minded language reform under the Republic and People's Republic of China have generally preferred to use calques and neologisms in place of loanwords, a growing number  particularly from American English  have become current in modern Chinese. On the mainland, transcription into Chinese characters in official media and publications is directed by the Proper Names and Translation Service of the Xinhua News Agency and its reference work Names of the World's Peoples.

Since Hong Kong was under British control until 1997, Hong Kong Cantonese borrowed many words from English such as 巴士 (from the word "bus", Mandarin: bāshì, Cantonese: baa1 si2), 的士 (from "taxi", Man.: dīshì, Can.: dik1 si2), 芝士 (from "cheese", Man.: zhīshì, Can.: zi1 si6), and 麥當勞/麦当劳 (from "McDonald's", Man.: Màidāngláo, Can.: Mak6 dong1 lou4), and such loanwords have been adopted into Mandarin, despite them sounding much less similar to the English words than the Cantonese versions.

Foreign businesses and products are usually free to choose their own transliterations and typically select ones with positive connotations and phonetic similarity to their products: for example,  (IKEA) is "proper home". Owing to antonomasia and genericization, these can then enter general Chinese usage: for example Coca-Cola's  Man.: kěkǒu kělè ("delicious fun") has led to  Man.: kělè becoming the common Chinese noun for all colas.

Since the Kuomintang retreated to Taiwan after the Chinese Civil War, relations between the Republic of China and the People's Republic of China had been hostile, thus communication between Taiwan and mainland China became limited. For that reason, many loanwords and proper names became quite different from each other. For example, "cheese" in mainland China is 芝士 zhīshì, while cheese in Taiwan is 起司 qǐsī.

Sanskrit

Persian

English
Chinese words of English origin have become more common in mainland China during its reform and opening and resultant increased contact with the West. Note that some of the words below originated in other languages but may have arrived in Chinese via English (for example "pizza/披萨" from Italian). English acronyms are sometimes borrowed into Chinese without any transcription into Chinese characters; for example "IT" (information technology), "PPT" (PowerPoint), "GDP" (Gross domestic product), "APP" (mobile app), "KTV" (karaoke), or "DVD". A rarer occurrence is the blending of the Latin alphabet with Chinese characters, as in  "卡拉OK" ("karaoke"), “T恤” ("T-shirt"), "IP卡" ("internet protocol card").  In some instances, the loanwords exists side by side with neologisms that translate the meaning of the concept into existing Chinese morphemes. For instance, while the loanword for 'penicillin' is 盘尼西林 (pánníxīlín), a neologism that 'translates' the word was later coined, 青霉素 (qīngméisù), which means 'blue/green mold extract/essence'.  In contemporary Chinese, neologisms using native Chinese morphemes tend to be favored over loanwords that are transliterations.  In the case of penicillin, the term 青霉素 is used almost exclusively, while 盘尼西林 is viewed as an early 20th century relic.  Similarly, 'science' is now known as 科学 (kēxué) 'subject/specialty study' rather than 赛因斯 (sàiyīnsī), though it should be pointed out that the characters 科学 were actually coined in the late 19th century by the Japanese as a kanji compound.

In the chart below, loanwords in Taiwan will be written in traditional characters and loanwords in mainland China will be written in simplified characters.

Malay
These words are only used in Singapore and Malaysia.

See also
List of English words of Chinese origin
List of English words of Japanese origin
List of Spanish words of Chinese origin
List of English words of Cantonese origin
Chinglish
Gairaigo
Sino-Japanese vocabulary

Further reading

References

Chinese words of English origin
Cantonese words and phrases
Mandarin words and phrases
Taiwanese culture
Multilingualism
History of the Chinese language
Loanwords
Chinese